Battle of Schwyz im Muttenthal occurred on 14–15 August 1799 between French forces commanded by General of Division André Masséna and Major General von Franz Jellachich's brigade.  The French lost 500 killed, wounded or missing, and the Austrians lost 2,400 men and six guns.

References

1799 in Europe
Helvetic Republic
Battles involving Austria
Battles involving France
Campaigns of the French Revolutionary Wars by year
Conflicts in 1799
Schwyz
Battles of the War of the Second Coalition
Battles of the French Revolutionary Wars
War of the Second Coalition